The European Museum Forum is a museum organization under the Council of Europe. It is an independent, non-profit-making charity, registered in the United Kingdom and founded in 1977.

The European Museum Forum organizes the annual European Museum of the Year Award (EMYA), also established in 1977. EMYA is awarded to existing museums that have undergone modernization or expansion and newly opened museums, during the previous three years.

See also
 Europa Nostra
 The Best in Heritage

References

External links 
 European Museum Forum website

Organizations established in 1977
European culture
Museum organizations
Organizations based in Europe
Charities based in the United Kingdom